The 2017 NBA G League Draft was the 17th draft of the National Basketball Association G League. The draft was held on October 21, 2017, just before the 2017–18 season.

Key

Draft
Source:

First round

Other notable draftees

References

Draft
NBA G League draft
National Basketball Association lists
NBA Development League draft